Taylor Gun-Jin Wang (born June 16, 1940) is a Chinese-born American scientist and in 1985, became the first person of Chinese origin to go into space. While an employee of the Jet Propulsion Laboratory, Wang was a payload specialist on the Space Shuttle Challenger mission STS-51-B.

Early life and education

With ancestry in Yancheng, Jiangsu,  Republic of China, Wang was born in Shanghai to Wáng Zhāng and Yú Jiéhóng. He moved to Taiwan in 1952 with his family. He studied his later part of elementary school in Kaohsiung, and graduated from The Affiliated Senior High School of National Taiwan Normal University in Taipei, Taiwan. He later moved to Hong Kong. He started studying physics in UCLA in 1963, and received his Bachelor of Science in 1967, and his Master of Science in 1968, and his doctoral in low temperature physics - Superfluid and solid state physics in 1972

Career and research

After completing his doctorate, Wang joined the California Institute of Technology's Jet Propulsion Laboratory (JPL) in 1972, as a senior scientist. At JPL he was responsible for the inception and development of containerless processing science and technology research. He was the Principal Investigator (PI) on the Spacelab 3 mission NASA Drop Dynamics (DDM) experiments, PI on the NASA SPAR Flight Experiment #77-18 "Dynamics of Liquid Bubble," PI on the NASA SPAR Flight Experiment #76-20 "Containerless Processing Technology," and PI on the Department of Energy Experiment "Spherical Shell Technology."

He gained US citizenship in 1975, and published a paper on the dynamic behavior of rotating spheroids in zero gravity the next year. The paper received attention in NASA, and Wang was selected as a payload specialist on June 1, 1983, for the Spacelab-3 mission.

Wang conducted precursor drop dynamics experiments for the DDM in ground-based laboratories employing acoustic levitation systems, neutral buoyancy systems and drop towers, and in the near-weightless environment provided by JSC's KC-135 airplane flights and SPAR rockets. These flights have helped to define the experimental parameters and procedures in the DDM experiments performed on Spacelab 3. He is the inventor of the acoustic levitation and manipulation chamber for the DDM. (Wang, T.G., M. Saffren, D. Elleman and J.C. Fletcher (1975) Material Suspension Within an Acoustically Excited Resonant Chamber. U.S. Patent No. 3,882,732)

Spaceflight

Wang flew on STS-51-B Challenger (April 29-May 6, 1985). STS-51B/Spacelab-3 was launched from Kennedy Space Center, Florida, and returned to land at Edwards Air Force Base, California. It was the first operational Spacelab mission. The seven-man crew aboard Challenger conducted investigations in crystal growth, drop dynamics leading to containerless material processing, atmospheric trace gas spectroscopy, solar and planetary atmospheric simulation, cosmic rays, laboratory animals and human medical monitoring.

The launch was flawless; all systems were "go", except for Dr. Wang's experiment. His experimental apparatus developed a malfunction. The possibility of going home empty handed saddened him. As the first person of Chinese descent to go into Space, the Chinese American community had taken a keen interest in his mission.
 
At mission conclusion, Wang traveled over 2.9 million miles in 110 Earth orbits, and logged over 168 hours in space. While it was a successful mission, STS-51B mission commander Overmyer discovered while serving on the Challenger disaster investigation team that 51-B had had a similar problem with its O-rings during the launch. Morton Thiokol engineers told STS-51B crew, Don Lind that "you all came within three-tenths of one second of dying".

Post-spaceflight research

Utilizing insights from compound droplet experiments performed in the microgravity of NASA Shuttle Mission STS-51-B,  Dr. Taylor Wang, has developed an immunoisolation encapsulation system that protects cellular transplants, and sustains cell function — without immunosuppression drugs and their resulting negative side effects. This novel immunoisolation system is a multi-component, multi-membrane capsule that allows independent optimization of all capsule design parameters ensuring reproducible functions in large animals and humans. Results of Encapsulife's successful large animal trials, have recently been published in peer-reviewed research in Transplantation Journal. In this landmark research, encapsulated canine pancreatic islets were transplanted into dogs rendered diabetic by total pancreatectomy. No immunosuppression or anti-inflammatory therapy was used. The allotransplantations of encapsulated islets were well tolerated and biocompatible, and normalized fasting blood glucose levels in all of 9 dogs, were achieved for over two hundred days, with a single transplantation. Re-transplantation of encapsulated islets — a "booster" — was effective in providing glycemic control beyond the initial 200 days.

Professorship

Wang later became a Centennial Professor at Vanderbilt University in Nashville, Tennessee. He has written about 200 journal articles and holds 28 U.S. patents on acoustics, drops and bubble dynamics, collision and coalescence of drops, charged drop dynamics, containerless science, and encapsulation of living cells. His experiments were carried out in 1985 aboard United States Spacelab 3, and in 1992 aboard United States Microgravity Laboratory 1 (USML-1), and in 1995 aboard USML-2.

Recognition

Wang has received various honors and awards, including Space Flight Medal NASA 1985, Exceptional Scientific Achievement Medal NASA 1987, Asian Pacific American Achievement Award 1989. Llewellyn J. Evans Distinguished Scientific, Engineering and Management Award 1994. Educational Award Vanderbilt University Alumni League 1996. He was awarded Asian American Engineer of the Year Distinguished Science and Technology Award, CIE-USA, National Engineers Foundation 2007. He addressed the United Nations' General Assembly in 1990 as part of the "Only One Earth Day".

Wang is married to Beverly Feng with two sons, Kenneth Wang and Eric Wang.

See also
 List of Asian American astronauts
Wan Hu
Ed Lu
Leroy Chiao
Yang Liwei

References

 Taylor Wang, Igor Lacík, Marcela Brissová, Amrutur V. Anilkumar, Ales Prokop, David Hunkeler, Ray Green, Keivan Shahrokhi,   Alvin C. Powers 1997. A New Generation Capsule and Encapsulation System for Immunoisolation of Pancreatic Islets. Nature technology, 15, 358 – 36
 Encapsulation System for the Immunoisolation of Living Cells. US Patent 5,997,900 (1999)
 A Novel Reactor for Making Uniform Capsules. US Patent 6,001,312 (1999)
 Capsule Patches (CP) for Cellular Transplantation without Immunosuppression. US Patent 8,673,294 B2 (2008)
 SEMI-PERMEABLE CAPSULAR MEMBRANE WITH TAPERED CONDUIT FOR DIABETES REVERSAL. US Patent 9,408,807 (2016)
 Taylor Wang, Successful diabetes management without immunosuppressive drugs in NHP model has been demonstrated. Encapsulation system with tapered nanopore conduits achieved normal glycaemia with regulated insulin release. <Artificial Cells, Nanomedicine, and Biotechnology, An International Journal, Vol 46, Suppl.3 (2018)

External links
 
 Spacefacts biography of Taylor Wang
 Taiwan in Time: Around the world 110 times

1940 births
Living people
Affiliated Senior High School of National Taiwan Normal University alumni
American astronauts
Chinese astronauts
Chinese emigrants to the United States
American people of Taiwanese descent
University of California, Los Angeles alumni
Vanderbilt University faculty
Scientists from Jiangxi
American academics of Chinese descent
American aviators of Chinese descent
Space Shuttle program astronauts